"Rookie" / "Stay Gold" is FLOW's sixth single. It is a double A-Side single.  "Stay Gold" was used as the theme song for the Korean film Make It Big. It reached #32 on the Oricon charts in its first week and charted for 5 weeks.

Track listing

References

2005 singles
Flow (band) songs
Ki/oon Music singles
2005 songs
Song articles with missing songwriters